The East Carolina Pirates women's basketball team represents East Carolina University in women's basketball. The school competes in the American Athletic Conference in Division I of the National Collegiate Athletic Association (NCAA). The Pirates play home basketball games at the Williams Arena at Minges Coliseum at Greenville, North Carolina.

Season-by-season record
As of the 2015–16 season, the Pirates have a 672–570 record. They have won three conference tournaments (1984, 1985, 2007, and 2023) while going to the NCAA Tournament in 1982, 2007, and 2023.

Postseason results

NCAA Division I

AIAW Division I
The Pirates made one appearance in the AIAW National Division I basketball tournament, with a combined record of 1–2.

References

External links